Boiska-Kolonia refers to the following places in Poland:

 Boiska-Kolonia, Lublin Voivodeship
 Boiska-Kolonia, Masovian Voivodeship